All Saints' Episcopal Church, Waveland, is an historic Carpenter Gothic church built in 1898 on Crossroads Hill in Waveland, now part of Jensen Beach, Florida. It is the oldest church building located in what is now Martin County, Florida. It is also the northernmost parish in the present-day Episcopal Diocese of Southeast Florida. The church was built on Brevard County. From 1910-25, it was in St. Lucie County. Since 1925, it has been in Martin County. Its rector, W. Frisby Hendricks III recently, retired and the parish is starting the search process to call a new rector.

In 1963, the church building was moved a few 100 feet to a more prominent place (which now has the address of 2377 N.E. Patrician Street) at the top of Crossroads Hill. A new rectory (now the parish offices) was built on the old location, which now has the address of 2303 N.E. Seaview Drive, which is the church's mailing address. Since being moved, the church building has been added onto twice but care was taken to preserve its architectural integrity.

In 1989, All Saints Episcopal Church was listed in A Guide to Florida's Historic Architecture, published by the University of Florida Press.

All Saints Episcopal Church is also featured in the 2009 Historic Episcopal Churches Engagement Calendar published by the National Episcopal Historians and Archivists.

History of the parish
The first Episcopal church services in the Jensen Beach area were held on November 23, 1894, when William Crane Gray, Missionary Bishop of Southern Florida, came down the Indian River by boat to Eden and preached in the schoolhouse there. Later the same day, he walked down to Jensen and preached in the parlor of the Al Fresco Hotel. That simple beginning resulted in the formation of two parishes: St. Paul's in Walton north of Eden and All Saints' in Waveland south of Jensen.

All Saints Cemetery

All Saints Cemetery, sometimes called Waveland Cemetery or All Saints Waveland Cemetery, is the only cemetery in Jensen Beach and is non-profit. Although the cemetery is affiliated with All Saints Church, it is non-sectarian and serves as the community's cemetery.

Old section
The old section runs from Dixie Highway, S.R. 707, west up the hill to the church property. Upright markers range from plain wooden ones (which are no longer legible) to elaborate granite and marble ones.

New section
The much larger new section abuts both the old section and the church property on their north sides and runs from Dixie Highway up and over the hill to the Florida East Coast Railway tracks. Until recently, it was a lawn area and only allowed stone or bronze markers which are flush with the ground. Several upright markers have been permitted recently in this area.

Mausoleums, cremation section and Serenity Gardens
Since the land, in both the old and new sections, that lies between the foot of the hill and Dixie Highway is too low for standard in-ground burials, it is now being used for three mausoleums, a cremation section and the new Serenity Gardens, which is also for cremated remains.

Alleluia Cross and Outdoor Altar

The Georgia granite Alleluia Cross and Outdoor Altar are located 65 feet east of the eastern wall of the church on the west side of the parking lot overlooking the cemetery and Dixie Highway below and the Indian River to the east. They were given by Wallace E. Conkling (1896–1979), retired bishop of the Episcopal Diocese of Chicago, in memory of his wife, Constance Lillian (Sowby) Conkling, who died on March 9, 1969, and whose ashes were interred beneath the altar.

The east side of the cross is inscribed vertically "ALLELUIA", while the west side is inscribed "JESU MERCI" meaning "Thank You Jesus." Bishop Conkling was bishop in residence at All Saints' for many years and after he died on August 27, 1979, his ashes were also interred under the outdoor altar. The base of the cross is inscribed on the west side: "Wallace Edmonds Conkling / The Bishop of Chicago / 1941-53 / August 27, 1979 / Constance Sowby Conkling / his wife / March 9, 1969." The Diocese of Chicago gave money to All Saints' to provide for the care of Bishop Conkling's grave.

The parish's Easter Sunrise Services are held there each year. Other services such as the Blessing of the Animals are also held there from time to time. The cross itself has a twin in the cemetery of St. Gregory's Abbey, Three Rivers, Michigan.

See also

Episcopal Diocese of South Florida, All Saints' original diocese

Resources
Thurlow, Sandra Henderson, Historic Eden and Jensen on Florida's Indian River (2004) Stuart: Sewall's Point Company,

References

External links

All Saints' Episcopal Church website
 All Saints Cemetery at Find A Grave
Martin County Genealogical Society Cemetery Project: All Saints Cemetery
List of Inscriptions in Old Section of Cemetery, compiled by Myrtle M. Dyer, circa 1948, accessed July 21, 2007

Churches in Martin County, Florida
Episcopal church buildings in Florida
Carpenter Gothic church buildings in Florida
Cemeteries in Florida
Relocated buildings and structures in Florida
Jensen Beach, Florida
1898 establishments in Florida
Churches completed in 1898